Cristian Cesaretti (born 20 June 1987) is an Italian footballer.

Biography

Empoli
Born in Lucca, Tuscany region, Cesaretti started his career at Tuscan club Empoli. In 2006–07 season, Cesaretti played 3 times for the first team, all in the cup. From 2007 to 2009, he spent 2 seasons in the third level – 2007–08 Serie C1 and 2008–09 Lega Pro Prima Divisione respectively. From 2009 to January 2011 Cesaretti was a member of the first team of Empoli in Italian Serie B. Cesaretti wore no.10 shirt in 2010–11 Serie B, which vacated by Ighli Vannucchi. In 2009–10 Serie B he wore no.20 shirt.

On 31 January 2011 Cesaretti left for fellow second division club Frosinone in temporary deal with option to sign half of the registration rights of the player. The Lazio club relegated at the end of season. Cesaretti also sent off twice that season, all with Empoli. Cesaretti wore no.6 shirt which vacated by Gennaro Scarlato for Frosinone in 2010–11 Serie B. Frosinone did not sign Cesaretti at the end of season.

Since returned to Empoli on 1 July 2011, Cesaretti added 8 games to his Empoli account, but also sent off once. That season he changed to wear no.11 vacated by Salvatore Foti, and gave the legendary no.10 to former Italian internationals Francesco Tavano.

Serie C
On 31 January 2012 Cesaretti returned to the city of Frosinone, for the third level club in the same formula. On 20 July 2012 Cesaretti signed a new 3-year contract with Frosinone after the club signed him definitively.

On 17 June 2019, Cesaretti joined Gubbio.

On 14 January 2020, he signed a 1.5-year contract with Cavese.

On 1 October 2020, he moved to Paganese.

On 1 February 2021, he signed with Ravenna.

References

External links
 Lega Serie B profile 
 AIC profile (data by football.it) 
 La Gazzetta dello Sport profile (2011–12) 
 

1987 births
Sportspeople from Lucca
Living people
Italian footballers
Association football forwards
Empoli F.C. players
A.S.D. Sangiovannese 1927 players
S.S.D. Lucchese 1905 players
A.C. Monza players
A.S.D. Città di Foligno 1928 players
Frosinone Calcio players
U.S. Città di Pontedera players
FeralpiSalò players
Santarcangelo Calcio players
Paganese Calcio 1926 players
A.S. Gubbio 1910 players
Cavese 1919 players
Ravenna F.C. players
Italy youth international footballers
Serie B players
Serie C players
Footballers from Tuscany